Kyō Kara Watashitachi wa: GFriend 1st Best (stylized as Kyō Kara Watashitachi wa ~ GFRIEND 1st BEST ~) is the debut Japanese album by South Korean girl group GFriend and the first compilation album of the group. It was released on May 23, 2018, by King Records. A music video was released for the lead single "Kyō Kara Watashitachi wa (Me Gustas Tu)" on May 6, 2018.

Release and promotion 
Kyō Kara Watashitachi wa: GFriend 1st Best was released on May 23, 2018 in five editions: the regular one, two limited editions (Type A and Type B), the WEB one and the King e-Shop edition.  The album contains Japanese and Korean versions of five of their previous title tracks as well as the song "Trust" from the EP Snowflake. The limited edition Type B contains as well a DVD with the music video of the Japanese version of "Me Gustas Tu" and the documentary movie of the group's Japanese debut.

Track listing

Charts

References 

2018 compilation albums
2018 debut albums
GFriend albums
King Records (Japan) compilation albums
Japanese-language compilation albums
Hybe Corporation albums